Frank Lieberam (born 17 December 1962) is a German former football player and manager.

Playing career
Lieberam was born in Halberstadt, East Germany. He started his senior playing career at DDR-Oberliga side 1. FC Magdeburg in 1982. In 1985, he left for BSG Stahl Riesa where he spent only one season, before moving on to SG Dynamo Dresden in 1986. He was a Stasi informer. After German reunification, he played in five Bundesliga matches with Dresden, before he transferred to K-League side Hyundai Horang-i in the winter-break. After six months he was signed by then-2. Bundesliga side VfL Wolfsburg. Later he returned to the 1. FC Magdeburg and his home town club Germania Halberstadt. At the height of his performance at Dynamo Dresden in the spring of 1989 Lieberam won one cap for the East Germany national team.

Coach and manager

After his playing career he took up managing, starting at FC Erzgebirge Aue in July 1998. He stayed on until April 1999 and later took over Germania Halberstadt in 2000. After he was sacked in Halberstadt in November 2004, he was hired by 1. FC Union Berlin where he stayed until he was fired in December 2005. In November 2006, he took on the manager position at MSV Neuruppin, but left the club over difficulties financing his ambitions in June 2007.

References

External links
 
 
 
 

1962 births
Living people
People from Halberstadt
People from Bezirk Magdeburg
German footballers
East German footballers
Footballers from Saxony-Anhalt
Association football defenders
East Germany international footballers
DDR-Oberliga players
Bundesliga players
2. Bundesliga players
K League 1 players
1. FC Magdeburg players
Dynamo Dresden players
Ulsan Hyundai FC players
VfL Wolfsburg players
German football managers
FC Erzgebirge Aue managers
1. FC Union Berlin managers
German expatriate footballers
German expatriate sportspeople in South Korea
Expatriate footballers in South Korea
People of the Stasi